Kottonmouth Kings is the eponymous sixth studio album by American hip hop group Kottonmouth Kings. It was released on May 31, 2005 via Suburban Noize Records. The album is also known as "No. 7" because of it being the seventh release overall.

Production was handled by Mike Kumagai and member Daddy X, who also served as executive producer together with Kevin Zinger. It features guest appearances from Cypress Hill and Tech N9NE.

The album peaked at number fifty on the Billboard 200, No. 21 on the Top Rap Albums, No. 2 on the Independent Albums, No. 50 on the Top Internet Albums, and No. 50 on Billboard Comprehensive Albums.

Track listing

Personnel

Brad "Daddy X" Xavier – vocals, producer, executive producer
Dustin "D-Loc" Miller – vocals
Timothy "Johnny Richter" McNutt – vocals
BJ Smith – backing vocals (tracks: 3, 7, 13, 20)
Ricky "Vodka" Gaez – backing vocals (track 7)
Aaron "Tech N9NE" Yates – vocals (track 8)
Bill "Big B" Mahoney – backing vocals (tracks: 10, 14)
Anna Rose – vocals (track 10)
Sky Blue Xavier – vocals (track 10)
Raymond Calhoun – backing vocals & drums (track 11)
Louis "B-Real" Freeze – vocals (track 12)
Senan "Sen Dog" Reyes – vocals (track 12)
Doug Carrion – guitar (tracks: 9, 10, 15, 19), bass (tracks: 9, 15, 19)
Tom Brayton – drums (track 9)
Brad Gordon – keyboards (track 11)
Mike Sattin – bass (track 11)
Will "Sweet Dick" Perry – additional vocals
Mike Kumagai – producer, recording, mixing
Patrick "P-Nice" Shevelin – recording, mixing
Tom Baker – mastering
Kevin Zinger – executive producer

Charts

References

External links

2005 albums
Kottonmouth Kings albums
Suburban Noize Records albums